Damitha Hunukumbura (born 7 November 1977) is a Sri Lankan first-class cricketer who plays for Galle Cricket Club. He made his Twenty20 debut on 17 August 2004, for Colombo Cricket Club in the 2004 SLC Twenty20 Tournament.

References

External links
 

1977 births
Living people
Sri Lankan cricketers
Galle Cricket Club cricketers
Colombo Cricket Club cricketers
Sportspeople from Kurunegala
Wicket-keepers